Kim Go-eun (born October 22, 1983), better known by the stage name Byul (lit. star), is a South Korean singer. She debuted in 2002 with the album December 32.

Career 
Her debut album was released on October 10, 2002.

It was announced at the end of January 2009 that Primary, her fifth album, would be released the following month. Teaser posters were distributed in 7-11 stores.

Personal life
On August 15, 2012, it was announced that Byul was to marry Haha, South Korean singer, actor and cast member of the variety show Running Man, on November 30, 2012. The couple welcomed their first child, a son named Dream, on July 9, 2013. Their second son, Soul, was born on March 22, 2017. Their third child, a daughter, named Song, was born on July 15, 2019.

Discography

Studio albums

Extended plays

Singles

Soundtrack appearances

Filmography 
 No Money (2021)  Host with Lee Ji-hye
 Mama The Idol (2021)
 Sisters Run - Witch Fitness Basketball Club (2022) Cast Member
 Haha Bus (2023) - with family

Theater

Awards 
SBS Gayo Daesang New Artist Award (2002)

Notes

References

External links 
Official Website

Living people
JYP Entertainment artists
K-pop singers
South Korean women pop singers
1983 births
South Korean female idols
21st-century South Korean singers
21st-century South Korean women singers